The Lancair Legacy, a modernized version of the Lancair 320, is a low-wing two-place retractable-gear composite monoplane, manufactured by the American company Lancair. It is available as a kit that cost US$71,500 in 2011. There is also a fixed-gear version, the Legacy FG. The retractable version of the Legacy cruises at 276 mph at 8,000 ft and the fixed gear version cruises at 215 mph.

Design and development

The Legacy features a cantilever low wing, a two-seats-in-side-by-side configuration enclosed cockpit under a bubble canopy, fixed or retractable tricycle landing gear and a single engine in tractor configuration.

The aircraft is made from vacuum-formed composite sandwiches. Its  span wing employs a Cole CG10 airfoil at the wing root and a Cole GC11 airfoil at the wingtip. The standard engine used is the  Continental IO-550 but engines as small as the  Lycoming IO-360 four-stroke powerplant can be fitted.

Four Lancair Legacy aircraft have won the Grand Champion Kit Built award at the EAA AirVenture airshow, in 2012, 2013, 2014, and 2016.

In May 2016, Lancair announced that the company was ending production of new Legacy aircraft kits due to the significant investments that would have been needed to continue manufacturing. The company sold the line in 2017 to Mark and Conrad Huffstutler, who now build the design as Lancair International, LLC, in Uvalde, Texas.

Variants
Legacy RG 550
Retractable landing gear model
Legacy FG 390 and FG 550

Fixed landing gear model with Lycoming IO-390 or IO-550
Legacy Turboprop
One example built with the project name "Turbulence"
CIAC T-90 Calima
Licence-built by CIAC in Colombia for the Colombian Air Force

Operators
In 2009 the Colombian Air Force ordered 25 modified Legacy FGs to be used as basic trainers. The aircraft feature 15% more wing area than the standard Legacy FG wing, leading-edge cuffs and a ventral fin to improve stability and low-speed handling along with a reshaped vertical tail and rudder. The aircraft are known as the Lancair Synergy and were delivered as kits for assembly in Colombia. The first Synergy was flown in September 2010.

Specifications (Legacy RG)

References

External links

 

Legacy
2000s United States sport aircraft
Single-engined tractor aircraft
Low-wing aircraft
Homebuilt aircraft